Mogens Jespersen (born 9 April 1949) is a Danish former football (soccer) player, who played 165 games and scored 55 goals for Aalborg Boldspilklub. He was the top goalscorer of the 1976 Danish football championship.

External links
 AaB profile

1949 births
Living people
Danish men's footballers
AaB Fodbold players
Place of birth missing (living people)

Association football forwards